Seventeen is the debut studio album by Belgian female singer Iris. It was released in Belgium on the April 26, 2012. The album has reached number 30 in Belgium. The album includes the singles "Wonderful" and "Would You?".

Singles
 "Wonderful" was the first single to be released from the album on November 18, 2011 the single peaked to number 28 in Belgium.
 "Would You?" was the second single released from the album on March 18, 2012. She will sing the song at the Eurovision Song Contest 2012 for Belgium. It has reached number 19 in Belgium.
 "Welcome to My World" was the third single released from the album on June 19, 2012.

Track listing

Chart performance

Release history

References

2012 debut albums
Iris (singer) albums